The 2013 Women's African Nations Championship was the 16th edition of the Women's African Volleyball Championship organised by Africa's governing volleyball body, the Confédération Africaine de Volleyball. It was held in Nairobi, Kenya, from 14 to 19 September 2013. The winner qualified for the 2014 World Grand Prix.

Kenya won the championship with Cameroon and Tunisia finishing second and third respectively.

Competing nations
The following national teams have confirmed participation:

Squads

Venue

Format
The competition system of the 2013 Women's African Championship is the single Round-Robin system. Each team plays once against each of the 5 remaining teams. Points are accumulated during the whole tournament, and the final ranking is determined by the total points gained.

Pool standing procedure
 Number of matches won
 Match points
 Sets ratio
 Points ratio
 Result of the last match between the tied teams

Match won 3–0 or 3–1: 3 match points for the winner, 0 match points for the loser
Match won 3–2: 2 match points for the winner, 1 match point for the loser

Round-Robin

|}

|}

Final standing

Jane Wacu,	
Everlyne Makuto,		
Esther Gatere,	
Diana Khisa,
Ruth Jepngetich,	
Janet Wanja,	
Violet Makuto,
Elizabeth Wanyama	(L),
Mercy Moim,	
Brackcides Khadambi,	
Gaudencia Makokha,	
Monica Biama

Awards
MVP:  Mercy Moim
Best Setter:  Jane Wacu
Best Receiver:  Binetou Sow
Best Libero:  Elizabeth Wanyama
Best Attacker:  Christelle Nana Tchoudjang
Best Blocker:  Esther Eba'a Mballa
Best Server:  Laetitia Moma Bassoko

References

External links
 Official website

2013 Women
African Women's Volleyball Championship
African Women's Volleyball Championship
Women's African Volleyball Championship
International volleyball competitions hosted by Kenya
September 2013 sports events in Africa